was a Japanese daimyō of the late Sengoku period to early Edo period who served as lord of the Aizu Domain. 
A retainer of Toyotomi Hideyoshi, he fought in the battle of Shizugatake in 1583, and soon became known as one of the shichi-hon-yari (七本槍), or Seven Spears of Shizugatake, 

Yoshiaki was one of Hideyoshi's seven most trusted and experienced generals. He was involved in the bitter naval battles at Siege of Shimoda in the Odawara Campaign (1590) and fought off the coast of southern Korean peninsula during the 1st and 2nd Korean Campaign, many of which went in favor of the Korean navy.

After Hideyoshi's death in 1598, Katō fought alongside Tokugawa Ieyasu. Following the important victory at Sekigahara in 1600, Tokugawa doubled Katō's fief from 100,000 koku to 200,000. For a time, he was lord of Aizu.

See also
Katō Kiyomasa
Siege of Shimoda

Popular culture
 Portrayed by Kim Kang-il in the 2014 film The Admiral: Roaring Currents.
 Portrayed by Kim Sung-kyun in the 2022 film Hansan: Rising Dragon.

References

1563 births
1631 deaths
Samurai
Daimyo
Toyotomi retainers